In plane geometry, Morley's trisector theorem states that in any triangle, the three points of intersection of the adjacent angle trisectors form an equilateral triangle, called the first Morley triangle or simply the Morley triangle. The theorem was discovered in 1899 by Anglo-American mathematician Frank Morley. It has various generalizations; in particular, if all of the trisectors are intersected, one obtains four other equilateral triangles.

Proofs
There are many proofs of Morley's theorem, some of which are very technical.  
Several early proofs were  based on delicate trigonometric calculations. Recent proofs include an algebraic proof by  extending the theorem to general fields other than characteristic three, and John Conway's elementary geometry proof.  The latter starts with an equilateral triangle and shows that a triangle may be built around it which will be similar to any selected triangle.  Morley's theorem does not hold in spherical and hyperbolic geometry.

One proof uses the trigonometric identity

l to

The last equation can be verified by applying the sum of two angles identity to the left side twice and eliminating the cosine.

From the figure

and

Also from the figure

and

The law of sines applied to triangles  and  yields

and

Express the height of triangle  in two ways

and

Substituting equations (2) and (5) in the  equation and equations (3) and (6) in the  equation gives

and

Since the numerators are equal

or

Similar angles  and  equal , and similar angles  and  equal  Similar arguments yield the base angles of triangles  and 

In particular angle  is found to be  and from the figure we see that

Substituting yields

where equation (4) was used for angle  and therefore

Similarly the other angles of triangle  are found to be

Side and area

The first Morley triangle has side lengths

where R is the circumradius of the original triangle and A, B, and C are the angles of the original triangle. Since the area of an equilateral triangle is  the area of Morley's triangle can be expressed as

Morley's triangles
Morley's theorem entails 18 equilateral triangles.  The triangle described in the trisector theorem above, called the first Morley triangle, has vertices given in trilinear coordinates relative to a triangle ABC as follows:

 A-vertex = 1 : 2 cos(C/3) : 2 cos(B/3)
 B-vertex = 2 cos(C/3) : 1 : 2 cos(A/3)
 C-vertex = 2 cos(B/3) : 2 cos(A/3) : 1

Another of Morley's equilateral triangles that is also a central triangle is called the second Morley triangle and is given by these vertices:

 A-vertex = 1 : 2 cos(C/3 − 2/3) : 2 cos(B/3 − 2/3)
 B-vertex = 2 cos(C/3 − 2/3) : 1 : 2 cos(A/3 − 2/3)
 C-vertex = 2 cos(B/3 − 2/3) : 2 cos(A/3 − 2/3) : 1

The third of Morley's 18 equilateral triangles that is also a central triangle is called the third Morley triangle and is given by these vertices:

 A-vertex = 1 : 2 cos(C/3 − 4/3) : 2 cos(B/3 − 4/3)
 B-vertex = 2 cos(C/3 − 4/3) : 1 : 2 cos(A/3 − 4/3)
 C-vertex = 2 cos(B/3 − 4/3) : 2 cos(A/3 − 4/3) : 1

The first, second, and third Morley triangles are pairwise homothetic.  Another homothetic triangle is formed by the three points X on the circumcircle of triangle ABC at which the line XX −1 is tangent to the circumcircle, where X −1 denotes the isogonal conjugate of X.  This equilateral triangle, called the circumtangential triangle, has these vertices:

 A-vertex  = csc(C/3 − B/3) : csc(B/3 + 2C/3) : −csc(C/3 + 2B/3)
 B-vertex  = −csc(A/3 + 2C/3) : csc(A/3 − C/3) : csc(C/3 + 2A/3)
 C-vertex  = csc(A/3 + 2B/3) : −csc(B/3 + 2A/3) : csc(B/3 − A/3)

A fifth equilateral triangle, also homothetic to the others, is obtained by rotating the circumtangential triangle /6 about its center.  Called the circumnormal triangle, its vertices are as follows:

 A-vertex  = sec(C/3 − B/3) : −sec(B/3 + 2C/3) : −sec(C/3 + 2B/3)
 B-vertex  = −sec(A/3 + 2C/3) : sec(A/3 − C/3) : −sec(C/3 + 2A/3)
 C-vertex  = −sec(A/3 + 2B/3) : −sec(B/3 + 2A/3) : sec(B/3 − A/3)

An operation called "extraversion" can be used to obtain one of the 18 Morley triangles from another. Each triangle can be extraverted in three different ways; the 18 Morley triangles and 27 extravert pairs of triangles form the 18 vertices and 27 edges of the Pappus graph.

Related triangle centers

The centroid of the first Morley triangle is given in trilinear coordinates by

 Morley center = X(356) = cos(A/3) + 2 cos(B/3)cos(C/3) : cos(B/3) + 2 cos(C/3)cos(A/3) : cos(C/3) + 2 cos(A/3)cos(B/3).

The first Morley triangle is perspective to triangle ABC: the lines each connecting a vertex of the original triangle with the opposite vertex of the Morley triangle concur at the point

 1st Morley–Taylor–Marr center  = X(357) = sec(A/3) : sec(B/3) : sec(C/3).

See also
Angle trisection
Hofstadter points
Morley centers

Notes

References 
.
.

.
.
.
.

External links 
 Morleys Theorem at MathWorld
 Morley's Trisection Theorem at MathPages
 Morley's Theorem by Oleksandr Pavlyk, The Wolfram Demonstrations Project.

Theorems about triangles